Ministry for Internal Affairs of Sakha Republic is the main law enforcement organ in Sakha Republic, near Siberia in Russia.

External links
 Official Website in Russian
 Traffic Police in Sakha

Politics of the Sakha Republic
Sakha
Government ministries of the Sakha Republic